Jonathan Ringayen (born 27 September 1988) is a French former professional footballer who plays as a defender for La Roche VF. He played three matches in Ligue 2 for Guingamp during the 2011–12 season.

References
Jonathan Ringayen profile at foot-national.com

1988 births
Living people
People from La Roche-sur-Yon
Sportspeople from Vendée
French people of Réunionnais descent
French footballers
Association football defenders
Ligue 2 players
Championnat National players
Championnat National 2 players
Championnat National 3 players
TVEC Les Sables-d'Olonne players
Luçon FC players
En Avant Guingamp players
ÉFC Fréjus Saint-Raphaël players
Vannes OC players
Amiens SC players
US Créteil-Lusitanos players
Bergerac Périgord FC players
La Roche VF players
Footballers from Pays de la Loire